The Gothenburg tramway network is part of the public transport system organised by Göteborgs Spårvägar, controlled by Västtrafik in the Swedish city of Gothenburg. These figures are expected to increase when the second stage of Kringen (short for Kollektivringen, the public transport ring) is finished. The trams perform about 2,000 trips and cover 30,000 km per day. In 2018, 131 million journeys were made (with changes counting as a new journey).

History
The first tram line in Gothenburg was started in 1879 by the English company Gothenburg Tramway Ltd. This was a horse-drawn tramway, which stretched from Brunnsparken to Stigbergsliden. The city of Gothenburg bought the tramway in 1900, and introduced electrically powered trams only two years later when Sigfrid Edström led the electrification of the trams. During the next 40 years, the tram system was heavily expanded, reaching outside the city borders by 1907, and Hisingen in 1940.

In the 1960s, plans for converting the tram system to an underground rapid transit system were created, and the new tram sections to the Tynnered, Angered, Bergsjön and Länsmansgården suburbs were built free from level crossings and partly in tunnels to make a future conversion to underground standards easier. However, after further investigation, it was concluded that it would be too expensive to dig the necessary tunnels under the city centre, as the foundation of the city is partially made up of clay.

When Sweden's switch to right-hand traffic in 1967 made existing unidirectional trams obsolete, Gothenburg was one of only two cities in Sweden to maintain its city-centre tramway, the other such network to survive being the Norrköping tramway.

The expansion of the net through the Kringen is gradually and step by step creating a tramway ring around the city centre. In 1999 the first step was started, which most notably included the 1050 m long Chalmers tunnel which was opened for traffic in 2002, connecting the Chalmers station with the Korsvägen hub. The second and third steps are currently in the planning stage.

Since 2010, the previously used magnetic stripe cards have been replaced with RFID cards. Ticket machines taking coins and credit cards have also been installed on the trams, along with a text message system where tickets may be purchased with mobile phones. From about 2019, a phone app has become the leading mode of ticket purchase.

Lines

Most tram lines pass through Brunnsparken, which is effectively the central hub of public transport in Gothenburg. The exceptions are lines 8 and 14. The Central Station is also a major stop, especially because it is the nearest stop not only for train passengers but also passengers coming from the neighbouring Nils Ericson Terminal, where coaches, airport buses to Landvetter Airport and City Airport (not being used for public passenger travel, but remains open for flying schools) and regional buses stop. Korsvägen is another major stop, where lines 6 and 8 meet lines going into the city centre and out to Mölndal. Most tram lines are on the south side of the river, but lines 5, 6, 10 and 14 cross the Hising bridge to the north side.

Rolling stock
The types of tramcars currently running in Gothenburg are:
 M28, ASJL 1965–1967, 701–711, 713–763, 766, 767 (M28 was permanently decommissioned for safety reasons on October 28, 2021)
 M29, Hägglund 1969–1972, 801–838, 840–857, 859, 860
 M31 (previously M21 ASEA 1984–1992, rebuilt with low-floor middle articulation), ASEA/MGB 1998–2003, 300–305, 307-380
 M32 Sirio, AnsaldoBreda 2005–2013, (as of January 2016) 401–465
 M33 Flexity Classic, Bombardier 2019–, 

In 2013 work with deciding new tram stocks began. By April 2016, it was announced that a minimum 40 trams of the new model M33 had been ordered from Bombardier Transportation Sweden AB/Vossloh Kiepe GmbH for delivery by year 2019.

There is a fleet of heritage trams used in the network.
One of the oldest trams, M1 15, which was built in 1902, is preserved in operational condition.

See also
List of Gothenburg tram stations

Notes

References

External links

 Göteborgs Spårvägar - Transport company  
 Official line map (Västtrafik) 
 Track plan of the Gothenburg tram system
 Urban Transport Technology - Gothenburg 
 Tram Travels: Göteborgs Spårvägar (GS)

Tram network
Tram transport in Sweden
Light rail in Sweden
1879 establishments in Sweden
1879 in rail transport
Articles containing video clips
Town tramway systems by city